is a former Japanese football player.

Playing career
Kanaguchi was born in Kyoto Prefecture on September 8, 1981. After graduating from high school, he joined the newly promoted J2 League club Mito HollyHock in 2000. Although he played often as midfielder, he did not become a regular player and retired at the end of the 2002 season.

Club statistics

References

External links

1981 births
Living people
Association football people from Kyoto Prefecture
Japanese footballers
J2 League players
Mito HollyHock players
Sportspeople from Kyoto
Association football midfielders